Laura Muñoz (born 9 June 1970) is a Spanish gymnast. She competed at the 1984 Summer Olympics and the 1988 Summer Olympics.

References

External links
 

1970 births
Living people
Spanish female artistic gymnasts
Olympic gymnasts of Spain
Gymnasts at the 1984 Summer Olympics
Gymnasts at the 1988 Summer Olympics
Gymnasts from Madrid
20th-century Spanish women